Zeta Octantis, Latinized from ζ Octantis, is a solitary, yellowish-white hued star located in the southern circumpolar constellation Octans. It has an apparent magnitude of 5.42, making it faintly visible to the naked eye under ideal conditions. At its current distance, Zeta Octantis' brightness is diminished by 0.25 magnitudes due to interstellar dust.

This s an evolved A-type star with a stellar classification of A8/9 IV. David S. Evans and colleagues, however, give it a classification of F0 III, which suggests it is already an evolved giant star. It has double the Sun's mass, and 2.25 times the Sun's radius. Zeta Octantis is estimated to be 1.25 billion years olds based on stellar evolution models by Trevor J. David and Lynne A. Hillenbrand. It has a low metallicity, having only 44% the abundance of heavy metals compared to the Sun.

References 

A-type subgiants
Octantis, Zeta
079837
3678
043908
PD-85 00183
Octans
Octantis, 9